This article lists the popes who have been canonised. A total of 83 out of 265 deceased popes have been recognised universally as canonised saints, including all of the first 35 popes (31 of whom were martyrs) and 52 of the first 54. If Pope Liberius is numbered amongst the saints as in Eastern Christianity, all of the first 49 popes become recognised as saints, of whom 31 are martyr-saints, and 53 of the first 54 pontiffs would be acknowledged as saints.

The most recently reigning Pope to have been canonised was Pope John Paul II, whose cause for canonisation was opened in May 2005. John Paul II was beatified on May 1, 2011, by Pope Benedict XVI and later canonised, along with Pope John XXIII, by Pope Francis on April 27, 2014. Pope Francis also canonised Pope Paul VI on October 14, 2018.

Saints

Blesseds

Venerables

Servants of God

See also

Lists
List of popes who died violently
List of popes
List of popes sorted alphabetically
List of popes by length of reign
List of Sovereigns of the Vatican City State

Related topics
Annuario Pontificio
History of the papacy
Index of Vatican City-related articles
Legends surrounding the papacy
Liber Pontificalis
Prophecy of the Popes

References

Canonised

List of popes, canonised